Mississauga North was an electoral riding in Ontario, Canada, in the municipal areas of Mississauga and Brampton from 1975 to 1999. Prior to 1975 it was contained within the ridings of Peel North and Peel. After 1999 it was re-distributed to two new ridings: Brampton West—Mississauga and Bramalea—Gore—Malton—Springdale.

Members of Provincial Parliament

References

Politics of Mississauga
Former provincial electoral districts of Ontario